History and Anthropology is a peer-reviewed academic journal covering anthropology published by Routledge. From 1984 until 2013, it was published quarterly. From 2014, the journal began publishing five times a year. The founding editors-in-chief were François Hartog (University of Strasbourg), Lucette Valensi, and Nathan Wachtel (both of Ecole des Hautes Etudes en Sciences Sociales). The current editor is David Henig (University of Kent).

Abstracting and indexing 
The journal is abstracted and indexed in Anthropological Index Online, Historical Abstracts, Humanities International Index, Index Islamicus, International Bibliography of the Social Sciences, and Sociological Abstracts.

External links 
 

English-language journals
Anthropology journals
Routledge academic journals
Publications established in 1984
5 times per year journals